Davao del Sur's 2nd congressional district is an obsolete congressional district in Davao del Sur for the House of Representatives of the Philippines from 1987 to 2016. The district encompassed eight southern local government units of the previously undivided province, most of which now constitute the province of Davao Occidental. It was created ahead of the 1987 Philippine House of Representatives elections following the ratification of the 1987 constitution which established two districts for Davao del Sur and another three districts for Davao City. Prior to the 1987 apportionment, Davao del Sur residents elected their representatives to the national legislatures on a provincewide basis through the Davao del Sur's at-large congressional district. The district was last contested at the 2013 Philippine House of Representatives elections. Davao del Sur returned to electing its representatives at-large in 2016 after losing most of its southern territory to the province of Davao Occidental created by Republic Act No. 10360 on January 4, 2013.

Representation history

See also
Legislative districts of Davao del Sur

References

Former congressional districts of the Philippines
Politics of Davao del Sur
1987 establishments in the Philippines
2016 disestablishments in the Philippines
Congressional districts of the Davao Region
Constituencies established in 1987
Constituencies disestablished in 2016